The 2016 FIBA Asia Under-18 Championship was the 24th edition of the Asian Championship for Junior Men aged 18 years old and below. The tournament was held in Tehran, Iran from July 22 to 31. The top three teams will qualify and will represent FIBA Asia the 2017 FIBA Under-19 World Championship in Egypt. This will be the second time the country will host the tournament after successfully staging the 20th edition eight years ago.

Qualification

According to the FIBA Asia rules, the number of participating teams in the FIBA Asia Under-18 Championship is sixteen. Each of the six FIBA Asia Sub-Zones had two places, and the hosts (Iran) and holders (China) were automatically qualified. The other four places are allocated to the zones according to performance in the 2014 FIBA Asia Under-18 Championship.

Allocation 

Only 12 teams registered to participate in this tournament. No teams from the Persian Gulf region entered despite being allocated two automatic berths.

Teams

Draw
Only 12 teams participate in this tournament. The FIBA Boys' World Ranking are shown within the parenthesis.

Venue
This year's tournament was held at the Twelve Thousand People Sport Hall, located in the north & south of the main street of the Azadi Sport Complex.

Preliminary round
All times are in Iran Standard Time (UTC+04:30)

Group A

Group B

Final round

Quarterfinals

5th-8th-place semifinals

Semifinals

7th-place game

5th-place game

Bronze-medal match

Final

Referees
The following referees were selected for the tournament.

  Hadi Salem
  Zhoobin Jalili
  Mohsen Roushan Zamir
  Zhu Haiying
  Johan Christiana
  Imran Ali Baig
  Hawar Mohammed
  Shigeyuki Arisawa
  Arsen Andryushkin
  Hamlet Arakelyan
  Yevgeniy Mikheyev
  Alexey Stepanenko
  Lee Seung-Mu 
  Rabah Noujaim
  Joenard Garcia
  Nattapong Jontapa
  Wei Sheng-Hsuan

Final rankings

References

FIBA Asia Under-18 Championship
2016–17 in Asian basketball
2016–17 in Iranian basketball
International basketball competitions hosted by Iran
July 2016 sports events in Asia